Grosvenor Vale is a football ground in Ruislip, West London, England. It is the home ground of Wealdstone F.C. The current capacity of the ground is 4,085.

History
The ground was first opened in 1947 to house Ruislip Manor F.C., who played there until the club collapsed as a result of financial difficulties in 2008, whereupon the lease for the ground was purchased by Wealdstone F.C. Wealdstone moved into the stadium following 17 years of ground sharing with other clubs after leaving their Lower Mead ground in Harrow, 4 miles away.

The stadium has been slowly improved and expanded since then.

In the summer of 2022 Watford F.C. Women agreed to play the upcoming season at Grosvenor Vale.

References

Football venues in England
Sports venues in London
Sports venues completed in 1947
Wealdstone F.C.